Artur Serobyan (born 2 July 2003) is a professional football player who plays for Ararat-Armenia, and the Armenia national team.

Club career
Artur Serobyan is a graduate of the Yerevan Football Academy. At the age of 17, he already played in the senior team of Ararat-Armenia.

International career
Serobyan made his senior international debut for Armenia national team on 24 March 2022 in a friendly game against Montenegro, where he came in off the bench and played the last 20 minutes.

Career statistics

International

References

External links
 
 
 Profile at FFA.am

2003 births
Living people
Armenian footballers
Armenia international footballers